The Standing Committee on Scrutiny and Constitutional Affairs is a standing committee of the Parliament of Norway. It holds a supervisory role in relation to the proceedings of the parliament and public sector. The committee has 12 members and is chaired by Peter Frølich of the Conservative Party.

The rules require that all parliamentary parties be represented on this committee and by convention, the committee is chaired by a member of the largest opposition party.

From 1814 to 1972, the supervision of parliament was the responsibility of the Protocol Committee. From 1972 to 1981, it was dealt with by the standing committees. The Standing Committee on Scrutiny and Constitutional Affairs was established in 1981. It was reorganized and strengthened in 1993.

Members 2013–17

Leadership
The committee is headed by a chair, along with two vice chairs. Between 1993 and 2001, the committee had only one vice chair. 

Key

Chairs

Vice Chairs

First Vice Chairs

Second Vice Chair

References

Standing committees of the Storting
1981 establishments in Norway